The 2022 ICC Men's T20 World Cup Global Qualifier A was a cricket tournament that took place in February 2022 in Oman, as one of two global tournaments that together form the final stage of the qualification process for the 2022 ICC Men's T20 World Cup. In April 2018, the International Cricket Council (ICC) granted full international status to Twenty20 men's matches played between member sides from 1 January 2019 onwards. Therefore, all the matches in the Global Qualifiers were Twenty20 Internationals (T20Is).

Global Qualifier A was contested by eight teams that advanced from their Regional Finals, were eliminated in the first round of the 2021 ICC Men's T20 World Cup, or were one of the highest ranked sides not already qualified to this stage. The eight teams were placed in two groups, with two sides from each group advancing to the semi-finals. The two teams that reached the final of the Global Qualifier advanced to the 2022 ICC Men's T20 World Cup in Australia.

Immediately prior to the Global Qualifier, Ireland, Nepal, Oman and the United Arab Emirates played in a quadrangular series at the same venue. Canada and Germany played two warm-up matches against each other, while Bahrain planned friendlies against Nepal and Philippines. In another practice fixture, Canada beat Bahrain by 38 runs. The Philippines, making their debut in a global qualifier, had not played a game for three years since securing their place in the event, and some of their players had never met before the squad assembled in Oman.

Ireland finished top of their group to secure a place in the semi-finals. The UAE also qualified for the semi-finals as runners-up in their group despite a two-run, defeat to Bahrain in their last game. Vriitya Aravind scored 24 runs in the final over to ensure that the UAE finished the group with a superior net run rate than Bahrain. Nepal finished top of the other group as the only unbeaten side in the group stage, with Oman also progressing as runners-up. In the semi-finals, Ireland beat Oman by 56 runs, and the UAE beat Nepal by 68 runs, with both teams qualifying for the T20 World Cup. The UAE beat Ireland in the final by seven wickets, following a century from Muhammad Waseem. Although both finalists had already secured their places at the T20 World Cup, the result of the final determined the groups in which they would be placed.

Squads
The following squads were named for the tournament.

Ireland also named Neil Rock and Ben White as travelling reserves. Nepal named Pradeep Airee, Shahab Alam and Kushal Malla as travelling reserves. Karan KC was named in Nepal's squad and travelled to Oman, but was ruled out ahead of the tournament due to injury. Kushal Malla was added to the main squad on 19 February 2022 as a replacement for the injured Sharad Vesawkar. Shahi Fahim was also named as a reserve in Bahrain's travelling squad.

Group stage

Group A

 Advanced to the Semi-Finals
 Advanced to the Consolation play-offs

Group B

 Advanced to the Semi-Finals
 Advanced to the Consolation play-offs

Consolation play-offs

Bracket

5th Place semi-finals

7th-place play-off

5th-place play-off

Play-offs

Bracket

Semi-finals

3rd-place play-off

Final

Final standings
These were the final standings following the conclusion of the tournament.

 Qualified for the 2022 ICC Men's T20 World Cup.

See also
 2022 ICC Men's T20 World Cup Global Qualifier B

References

External links
 Series home at ESPN Cricinfo

Associate international cricket competitions in 2021–22
Qualifiers
ICC